SANSA (Servicios Aéreos Nacionales S.A.) is an regional airline based in San José, Costa Rica. It operates scheduled passenger services as part of the former TACA Regional system, and was a subsidiary of Avianca Holdings. Its main hub is Juan Santamaría International Airport.

History
The airline was established in 1978 as a domestic subsidiary of LACSA.

On May 31, 2019, Avianca Holdings sold SANSA to Regional Airlines Holding LLC, from Delaware, United States.

Destinations

The destinations of SANSA are:

Fleet

Current fleet

As of September 2022, the SANSA fleet includes:

Former fleet
1 Boeing 737-300 (Leased from Islandsflug)
3 Douglas C-47 Skytrain
3 CASA C-212 Aviocar

Accidents and incidents
On April 19, 1984, a Douglas C-47 (registered TI-SAA), charter flight coming from San Andrés, Colombia crashed on "Cerro Santa Rosa" (northwest face of the Irazú Volcano), with the death of all 4 people on board.
On January 16, 1990, SANSA Flight 32 crashed into the Cerro Cedral, a mountain in Costa Rica, after takeoff from Juan Santamaría International Airport in San José. All 20 passengers and 3 crew on board died in the crash.
On August 26, 2000, a Cessna 208B Grand Caravan crashed into the Arenal Volcano, an active volcano in Costa Rica. The Cessna Caravan took off from Juan Santamaría International Airport in San José at 11:38, for a flight to Tamarindo. An intermediate stop at La Fortuna was made at 11:55 to drop off a Japanese tourist. The flight left La Fortuna again at 12:05 for a 35-minute flight to Tamarindo. The aircraft collided with the active 5380 feet (1650 m) high Arenal volcano, at around 656 feet (200 m) below the crater. All 8 passengers and 2 crew on board died in the crash.
On November 28, 2001, a Cessna 208B Grand Caravan crashed into the Cerro Chontal, a mountain in Costa Rica. The aircraft crashed into a wooded hillside of the Cerro Chontal approximately four minutes before it was expected to land. The aircraft appeared to be off the usual approach track for Quepos. Both crew members and 1 passenger died; 5 passengers survived the crash and were rescued the next day.

References

External links

Official website

Airlines of Costa Rica
Airlines established in 1978
Avianca
Costa Rican brands
1978 establishments in Costa Rica
Grupo TACA
Latin American and Caribbean Air Transport Association